Dolly Makambo Nawezi is a politician in the Democratic Republic of the Congo. He has served as mayor of La Gombe in the Kinshasa province since 2008.

Makambo Nawezi lived in Montreal, Quebec, Canada for several years. He ran for election to the Montreal city council as an independent candidate in the 2001 municipal election and was defeated. In the late 2000s, he was a representative in Canada of the People's Party for Reconstruction and Democracy founded by Congolese president Joseph Kabila.

Makambo Nawezi was appointed as mayor of La Gombe by President Kabila on 24 September 2008. On March 8, 2011 (International Women's Day), he inaugurated a memorial in Gombe to Mpongo Love, a Congolese singer who died in 1990.

Electoral record
Canada

References

Living people
Mayors of places in the Democratic Republic of the Congo
Year of birth missing (living people)
21st-century Democratic Republic of the Congo people